In biochemistry, the oxygen rebound mechanism is the pathway for hydroxylation of organic compounds by iron-containing oxygenases.  Many enzymes effect the hydroxylation of hydrocarbons as a means for biosynthesis,  detoxification, gene regulation, and other functions.  These enzymes often utilize Fe-O centers that convert C-H bonds into C-OH groups.  The  oxygen rebound mechanism starts with abstraction of H from the hydrocarbon, giving an organic radical and an iron hydroxide.  In the rebound step, the organic radical attacks the Fe-OH center to give an alcohol group, which is bound to Fe as a ligand.  Dissociation of the alcohol from the metal allows the cycle to start anew.  This mechanistic scenario is an alternative to the direct insertion of an O center into a C-H bond.  The pathway is an example of C-H activation.

Three main classes of these enzymes are cytochrome P450, alpha-ketoglutarate-dependent hydroxylases, and nonheme-diiron hydroxylases.

References

Organic redox reactions
Enzymes
Oxygenases